James Andrew McCammon (born 1947, Lafayette, Indiana, USA) is an American physical chemist known for his application of principles and methods from theoretical and computational chemistry to biological systems. A professor at the University of California, San Diego, McCammon's research focuses on the theoretical aspects of biomolecular and cellular activity. In 2011 he was elected to the National Academy of Sciences.

Prof. McCammon co-authored Dynamics of Proteins and Nucleic Acids (Cambridge University Press, 1987), an important contribution to molecular mechanics and molecular dynamics, with Stephen Harvey, while the first published reports on molecular mechanics and molecular dynamics can be found as early as 1976, most likely even earlier.

Early life
McCammon attended Pomona College, graduating in 1969.

Contributions
"The Cray Research Information Technology Leadership Award for Breakthrough Computational Science, Dr. Andrew McCammon of the University of San Diego, for his pioneering use of supercomputing technology in analyzing chemical enzyme inhibitors to fight Alzheimers and other diseases." (Business Wire,  June 6, 1995)

Awards 
 Elected Member, National Academy of Sciences of the USA (2011)
 American Chemical Society (ACS) National Award for Computers in Chemical and Pharmaceutical Research (2008)
 Elected Fellow, American Academy of Arts and Sciences (2006)
 UCSD SPPS Associated Students Teaching Award (2003)
 UC Chancellor's Associates Award for Research (2002)
 Appointed Investigator, Howard Hughes Medical Institute (2000–present)
 Joseph E. Mayer Chair of Theoretical Chemistry, UC San Diego (1995-)
 Smithsonian Award for Breakthrough Computational Science (1995)
 Cray Research Information Technology Leadership Award (1995)
 George Hitchings Award for Innovative Methods in Drug Design, Burroughs Wellcome Fund (1987–1992)
 Dreyfus Teacher-Scholar Award (1982–87)
 NIH Research Career Development Award (1980–85)

References

External links 
HHMI profile of J. Andrew McCammon
The McCammon research group at UCSD
UCSD Chemistry faculty profile of J. Andrew McCammon

1947 births
Living people
American physical chemists
University of California, San Diego faculty
Pomona College alumni
Harvard University alumni
Howard Hughes Medical Investigators
Members of the United States National Academy of Sciences
Computational chemists
Fellows of the American Physical Society